Fortunen is a neighbourhood in Lyngby-Taarbæk Municipality, located north of Copenhagen. It is located south of Hjortekær and east of Lundtofte and Kongens Lyngby. To the east of Fortunen is Jægersborg Dyrehave. Fortunen has existed since at least 1670, and was given royal permissions to house an inn since 1766.

References 

Cities and towns in the Capital Region of Denmark
Copenhagen metropolitan area
Neighbourhoods in Denmark
Lyngby-Taarbæk Municipality